Héðinsfjarðargöng are two road tunnels in northern Iceland, connecting Ólafsfjörður and Siglufjörður. They were opened on October 2, 2010. The total cost was around ISK 12 billion ($106 million).

Social, economic and cultural impact of the tunnels 
In 2008, a seven-year research project was initiated to evaluate the social, economic, and cultural impact of the Héðinsfjörður tunnels. The project was directed by Professor Thoroddur Bjarnason and implemented by a research team at the University of Akureyri.

The results show that the tunnel traffic is above expectations. There is considerable commuting between Ólafsfjörður and Siglufjörður, and the vast majority of residents travel between them for shopping, services, events, and social participation. The regional economy has strengthened, and satisfaction with prices and diversity of goods and services has increased. Siglufjörður has become part of the Eyjafjörður tourism region and a destination for tourists between Akureyri and the Reykjavík capital region. 

There has not been an increase in the number of overnight stays, and the predicted tourism circle around the Tröllaskagi peninsula has not materialized. The services of state and municipality have been reduced, in part as result of the economic crisis of 2008. Residents are more satisfied with their educational opportunities but less satisfied with policing and access to health services. Tensions between residents of the two towns do not appear to have increased, even though Ólafsfjörður residents tend to think that they do not receive their fair share in public services. A population increase has been observed in Siglufjörður, while population decline appears to have been halted in Ólafsfjörður. There has in particular been an increase in the number of younger women, young children, and foreign citizens, and young people are more likely to expect to stay in their home community.

External links
Iceland Review article
Official information brochure in Icelandic

References 

Road tunnels in Iceland
Tunnels completed in 2010
Buildings and structures in Northeastern Region (Iceland)